Jack Hidary is a technology researcher and entrepreneur. He is the CEO of quantum technology company Sandbox AQ. With his brother Murray Hidary, he co-founded the web portal EarthWeb in 1995 which later went public and acquired Dice.com.

Hidary has collaborated with MIT on a series of papers focused on deep learning.  In particular, the papers address the generalization of deep learning networks.  Hidary is also the author of Quantum Computing: An Applied Approach.

Early life and education
Hidary was born at the Brookdale Hospital in the Brownsville section of Brooklyn and raised near Coney Island. He is the oldest of four brothers and a sister. He attended school at Yeshivah of Flatbush.

Hidary studied philosophy and neuroscience at Columbia University and was awarded a Stanley Fellowship in Clinical Neuroscience at the National Institutes of Health.  At NIH, Hidary focused on functional MRI studies of brain function and the application of neural network technologies to the analysis and modelling of fMRI imaging data and brain function.

Entrepreneurial career
In 1995, Jack Hidary co-founded the IT information portal EarthWeb with his brother Murray Hidary and entrepreneur Nova Spivack.  In 1998, they took the company public.  EarthWeb's IPO was one of the largest first-day returns in NASDAQ history. In 1999, under Hidary's leadership, EarthWeb acquired the tech career website Dice.com.  In 2000, the team renamed the company Dice Inc and then later as DHI Holdings, Inc.

Hidary co-founded Vista Research in 2001 as an independent financial research company serving institutional investors, drawing on experts in the fields of technology, media, telecommunications, energy, aerospace and healthcare. Vista Research was acquired in 2005 by the Standard & Poor’s division of McGraw-Hill.

In 2016, Hidary founded a quantum technology group at Alphabet Inc. In March 2022, it was spun out into a standalone company, Sandbox AQ, with Hidary as CEO.

Social and policy initiatives
Jack Hidary has been a vocal proponent of renewable energy.  He is a trustee of the X Prize Foundation and the co-founder of the Auto X Prize, which inspired the development of highly fuel-efficient vehicles.

Hidary has served as a partner or trustee for numerous New York City groups, including the Partnership for New York City and the Citizens Budget Commission.

He has served on several boards including the advisory council for the National Renewable Energy Lab (NREL). He is on the board of the X Prize Foundation.

Politics
On July 17, 2013, Hidary announced his intent to run as an independent on a new party line called the Jobs and Education Party for New York City Mayor and succeed Michael Bloomberg. The New York Times described his political leanings as "socially progressive, fiscally reserved, and digitally savvy," and his primary goals are to better education, foster small business growth and spur employment across all boroughs, and attract companies and investment to New York. One of his primary initiatives is to increase productivity by wiring all of the city’s schools, businesses and neighborhoods for broadband Internet service. Another focus is to increase the number of tech incubators and shared workspaces across the city. On November 5, 2013, Hidary lost to Bill de Blasio in the mayoral election.

References

External links
 HidaryFoundation.org Hidary Foundation site

Living people
Philanthropists from New York (state)
Columbia College (New York) alumni
Businesspeople from New York City
American people of Syrian-Jewish descent
Year of birth missing (living people)